Morogoro Rural District is one of the six districts of the Morogoro Region of Tanzania. It is bordered to the north and east by the Pwani Region, to the south by Kilombero District, to the southwest by the Kilosa District and to the west by the Mvomero District and the Morogoro Urban District.

, the population of the Morogoro Rural District was 286,248.

Administrative subdivisions

Constituencies
For parliamentary elections, Tanzania is divided into constituencies. As of the 2010 elections Morogoro Rural District had no constituencies: The Morogoro-Kusini-Mashariki Constituency is located in Morogoro Urban District.

Divisions

, Morogoro Rural District had ten administrative divisions; however, as the number of wards has shrunk from forty-two in 1997 to twenty-five in 2002, it now has six divisions.

1997 divisions

Among the 1997 divisions were:
 Bwakira division,
 Mgeta division,
 Mlali division, 
 Mvuha division.

Wards

The Morogoro Rural District is administratively divided into twenty-five wards:

 Bwakila Chini
 Bwakila Juu
 Kasanga
 Kibogwa
 Kibungo Juu
 Kidugalo
 Kinole
 Kiroka
 Kisaki
 Kisemu
 Kolero
 Lundi
 Mikese
 Mkambalani
 Mkulazi
 Mkuyuni
 Mngazi
 Mvuha
 Mtombozi
 Ngerengere
 Selembala
 Singisa
 Tawa
 Tegetero
 Tununguo
 Gwata
  Konde
  Bungu
 Matuli

Notes

Districts of Morogoro Region